The 2007 Big 12 Conference baseball tournament was held at AT&T Bricktown Ballpark in Oklahoma City, OK from May 23 through 27.  Texas A&M won the tournament and earned the Big 12 Conference's automatic bid to the 2007 NCAA Division I baseball tournament. This was the second year the conference used the round robin tournament setup. The winners of each group at the end of the round robin faced each other in a one-game match for the championship.

Regular Season Standings
Source:

Colorado and Iowa State did not sponsor baseball teams.

Tournament

Texas Tech and Kansas did not make the tournament.
 Texas A&M held the tiebreaker over Texas by beating them head-to-head 7-3

All-Tournament team

See also
College World Series
NCAA Division I Baseball Championship
Big 12 Conference baseball tournament

References

Big 12 Tourney Results
Big 12 Standings

Tournament
Big 12 Conference Baseball Tournament
Big 12 Conference baseball tournament
Big 12 Conference baseball tournament
Baseball competitions in Oklahoma City
College sports tournaments in Oklahoma